Skistodiaptomus bogalusensis is a species of calanoid copepod in the family Diaptomidae.

The IUCN conservation status of Skistodiaptomus bogalusensis is "DD", data deficient, risk undetermined. The IUCN status was reviewed in 1996.

Subspecies
These two subspecies belong to the species Skistodiaptomus bogalusensis:
 Skistodiaptomus bogalusensis bogalusensis (M. S. Wilson & W. G. Moore, 1953)
 Skistodiaptomus bogalusensis marii (Harris, 1978)

References

Diaptomidae
Articles created by Qbugbot
Crustaceans described in 1953